Khor-e Shir Ali (also Romanized as Khor-e Shīr ‘Alī; also known as Jūb-e Shīr ‘Alī) is a village in Shabab Rural District 20 kilometers from Sarableh, in the Shabab District of Chardavol County, Ilam Province, Iran. At the 2006 census, its population was 103, in 28 families.

The village is populated by Kurds.

References 

Populated places in Chardavol County
Kurdish settlements in Ilam Province